The New South Wales Marine Corps (1786–1792) was an ad hoc volunteer unit that the British Royal Navy created to guard the convicts aboard the First Fleet to Australia, and to preserve "subordination and regularity" in the penal colony in New South Wales.

Established in 1786, the Marines saw active service in New South Wales from 1788 to 1792 and was instrumental in establishing the colony's rule of law. Study of the complete New South Wales Marine complement indicates they were chosen from Plymouth and Portsmouth Divisions with only one exception.

On 18 December 1791  left Port Jackson taking home the larger part of the still serving New South Wales Marines. Those leaving included Maj Robert Ross, Watkin Tench, William Dawes, and Ralph Clark, and 90 non-commissioned officers (NCOs) and privates. Of the departure, Tench said, "we hailed it with rapture and exhilaration". There remained in New South Wales a company of active Marines serving under Captain George Johnston, consisting of three officers, eight NCOs, two drummers and 50 privates. Also remaining in the colony were some 90 discharged Marines, many of whom became settlers. The official departure of the last serving Marines from the colony of New South Wales was in December 1792 when Governor Phillip departed aboard Atlantic Transport accompanied by the remaining three Marine lieutenants and some 20 NCOs and privates who received their final discharges at the Marine headquarters in Portsmouth in June 1793, marking the official disbandment of the Corps. Officers were allowed to transfer into other divisions to continue their careers.

Establishment
The Corps was established on 31 August 1786 with assent from King George III for a force of 160 enlisted marines and accompanying officers to attend the settlement of New South Wales "... for the purpose of enforcing subordination and obedience in the settlement [at Botany Bay], as well as for defence of that settlement against the incursions of the natives."

Recruits were offered a two-guinea incentive payment if they volunteered for the Corps. A further inducement was that although enlistment as a British Marine was traditionally for life, members of the New South Wales Marine Corps could seek an honourable discharge after three years of colonial service. With an eye to the likelihood of delays in setting out, the three-year term would commence on arrival of the Fleet in New South Wales rather than the dates of enlistment in England. Marines who chose this option had no automatic right of return to military service after discharge, but in practice few were refused re-entry when their service expired.

Rates of pay were in accordance with those of the British Marines, including routine provision of a subsistence allowance equivalent to two-thirds of daily pay. British Marines received the allowance when in the field (i.e., not serving on board a vessel); the NSW Marines received the allowance for the duration of their three-year enlistment, relieving the Admiralty or the government of the colony of the responsibility of providing messing facilities.

New South Wales Marine Corps uniforms consisted of a red long-tailed doublet, white trousers, black headdress, and shoes and gaiters. Officers were authorised to carry swords and sidearms; other ranks were issued Brown Bess muskets.

Active service
In May 1787 four companies of marines, consisting of 160 Privates with 52 officers and NCO's under Major Robert Ross, accompanied the First Fleet to Botany Bay. In addition there were 34 officers and men serving in Ship's Complement of Marines aboard Sirius and Supply, bringing the total to 246 departed England The Board of Ordnance had provided one thousand carbines and ten thousand musket flints for Marine use in New South Wales, but due to an oversight in provisioning, the Fleet left Portsmouth without any substantial supply of ammunition. The error was kept a secret from the convicts in order to avoid an uprising, and was addressed via resupply when the fleet made port in Rio de Janeiro midway through the voyage.

Security was strictly maintained during the voyage. Bulkheads filled with nails were constructed across each deck to separate the convict quarters from those of the Marines and ship's crew. Marines were routinely stationed at loopholes in these bulkheads in order to fire upon the convicts if necessary. Marines were located behind barricades constructed across the main deck and at each of the hatches leading below. A further Marine detachment was also permanently stationed on the quarterdeck.

A marine caught in the convict women's tent was drummed out of the Corps on 9 February 1788. The music played for the occasion was the "Rogues March", the first record of a named piece of music being played in Australia.

Precedent
The New South Wales Marines helped establish a precedent for the creation of ad hoc units for overseas service under the aegis of the Royal Marines. One example, from the Americas and the War of 1812, was the Corps of Colonial Marines, recruited from freed slaves.

See also
 List of Officers of the New South Wales Marine Corps

Citations and references
Citations

References

Military units and formations established in 1786
Military units and formations of the British Empire
Royal Marine formations and units
Convictism in New South Wales
Military history of New South Wales
Military units and formations of Australia
British colonial regiments
1786 establishments in England
Military units and formations disestablished in 1791
First Fleet